The 1998 Mid-Continent Conference men's basketball tournament was held March 1–3, 1998, at The MARK of the Quad Cities in Moline, Illinois.
This was the 15th edition of the tournament for the Association of Mid-Continent Universities/Mid-Continent Conference, now known as the Summit League.

Top-seeded Valparaiso defeated #3 seed  67–48 to earn an automatic berth into the 1998 NCAA tournament.

Bracket

References 

Summit League men's basketball tournament
1997–98 Mid-Continent Conference men's basketball season
1998 in sports in Illinois